Jean-Luc Laurent (born 23 June 1957) is a French politician formerly of the Citizen and Republican Movement. He was Member of Parliament for Val-de-Marne's 10th constituency from 2012 to 2017.

Political career 
He was elected to Parliament in Val-de-Marne's 10th constituency in the 2012 legislative election, defeating incumbent MP Pierre Gosnat from the Left Front.

He lost his seat to Mathilde Panot of La France Insoumise in the 2017 legislative election.

He has been Mayor of Kremlin-Bicêtre since 2020.

See also 

 List of deputies of the 14th National Assembly of France

References 

1957 births
Living people
People from Val-de-Marne

Deputies of the 14th National Assembly of the French Fifth Republic
Politicians from Île-de-France
21st-century French politicians
French eurosceptics
Mayors of places in Île-de-France